Night Life in Hollywood, called The Shriek of Hollywood in Europe, is a 1922 American silent comedy film directed by Fred Caldwell. It starred J. Frank Glendon, Josephine Hill, and Gale Henry, and featured a number of cameo appearances of celebrities with their families.

In 1922, Ada Bell Maescher organized the De Luxe Film Company to produce the propaganda picture, which would show the "real" living conditions in the film capital. Instead of depicting Hollywood as a lurid, sensual Babylon, with its reported debauches of depravity and wickedness, it was shown as a model city, beautiful and attractive, and populated with home-loving people.

The film is preserved, but incomplete, as reel 2 is lost.

Plot 
Joe Powell (Glendon) runs away from his small town in Arkansas to visit Hollywood, anticipating debauchery. After his sister Carrie Powell (Henry) heads there too, their father (McComer), mother (Rhodes), and younger sister follow them out there. Once the family is reunited in Hollywood, they learn that it is great place to live.

Cast 
Main cast

Cameos

Release and reception 
Sheet music of the cues from the film were distributed to theaters, and theater owners were told to distribute them, free of charge, to their customers.

The film received mixed reviews, but was commercially successful.

References 
Citations

Works cited

External links 

 
 
 A 2-page ad
 Another 2-page ad
 Multiple stills from the film
 A still from the film
 A still from the film, claiming to depict "one million people"
 A still of the pool scene from the film

1922 films
American black-and-white films
Silent American comedy films
American propaganda films
American silent feature films
Films about Hollywood, Los Angeles
1922 comedy films
Arrow Film Corporation films
1920s American films